Belafonte Sensacional is a Mexican rock and folk rock band based in Mexico City led by musician and composer Israel Ramírez.

History 
Belafonte Sensacional was the stage name that in 2009 Israel Ramírez —a musician from Iztapalapa, Mexico City began to use to interpret his songs until the project became a band. The name "Belafonte Sensacional" was taken from Wes Anderson's The Life Aquatic with Steve Zissou, although Ramirez has mentioned that it also refers to Mexican pulp magazines called "sensational" such as "Sensacional de Traileros", "Sensacional de barrios" and others.

The critic has called Belafonte Sensacional's style as Mexican folk. Among the stylistic influences that Belafonte Sensational has cited are Bob Dylan, Wilco, Bright Eyes, Woody Guthrie, The Kingston Trio, Johnny Cash, Nick Drake; also musicians of the Movimiento rupestre like Rockdrigo González and Jaime López; Trolebús, Three Souls in My Mind and Juan Gabriel. In his songs, references to Mexican literature have been included, such as the novel Gazapo by Gustavo Sainz and the literary works of José Agustín. In his songs, they frequently uses both Mexico City jargon and places.

Members 

 Israel Ramírez, acoustic guitar, dobro and solo voice.
 Julio Cárdenas, electric guitar
 Israel Pompa, electric bass
 Cristóbal Martínez, drums
 Alejandro Guerrero, harmonica and choirs
 Emmanuel García, trumpet
 Enrique Álvarez, choruses

Discography 

 2018: Soy piedra.
 2017: Destroy.
 2014: Gazapo.
 2010: Petit riot

Others 

 2014: "Verte regresar" with Paulina Lasa, in Verte regresar, compilado de canciones por Ayotzinapa, a collective album recorded to support 2014 Iguala mass kidnapping victims

References

External sources 

 Website of the band

Mexican alternative rock groups
Rock en Español music groups
Musical groups established in 2009